The Nigeria national futsal team represents Nigeria in international futsal competitions and is controlled by the Futsal Commission of the Nigeria Football Federation. Nigeria have played in one edition of the Africa Futsal Cup of Nations after making their debut at the 2008 edition of the tournament where they were eliminated in the first round. Nigeria has also played in the FIFA Futsal World Cup making their debut on the international stage in 1992 where they were eliminated in the group stage after losing all three of their matches (to Argentina, Poland and host country Hong Kong respectively).

Tournaments

FIFA Futsal World Cup
 1989 – Did not enter
 1992 – Round 1
 1996 to 2004 – Did not enter
 2008 to 2012 – Did not qualify
 2016 – Did not enter
 2020 – To be determined

Africa Futsal Cup of Nations
 1996 – Did not enter
 2000 – Did not enter
 2004 – Did not enter
 2008 – Round 1
 2011 – Cancelled
 2016 – Did not enter

References

External links
Nigeria Football Federation website

Nigeria
F
Futsal in Nigeria